Concoret (Konkored in Breton) is a commune in the Morbihan department of Brittany in north-western France.

Demographics
Inhabitants of Concoret are called in French Concoretois.

See also
Communes of the Morbihan department
Château de Comper

References

External links

Mayors of Morbihan Association 

Communes of Morbihan